The Sunday Times Travel Magazine was a monthly British travel magazine. Although part of the same company (News UK) as the weekly The Sunday Times travel section, its content was entirely different. The magazine published travel information, features, competitions, offers, and photography. It was established in February/March 2003 as a bi-monthly magazine, changing to a monthly frequency in 2005. , the magazine has a limited online presence, with less than 5% of its content available to view online. The remaining 95% is published exclusively in print. The magazine's last issue was October 2020.

Editors 
The following persons have been editor-in-chief of the magazine:
 2005 to present: Ed Grenby
 2004: Jane Knight
 2003: Brian Schofield

Awards 
The magazine has won the following awards:
 Travel Magazine of the Year 2013, 2012, Travel Press Awards
 Best Travel Magazine, 2012, 2011 British Travel Awards
 Editor of the Year 2009 Lifestyle Magazines category: Ed Grenby, Editor, British Society of Magazine Editors Awards
 Editor of the Year, 2006, Contract Magazines category: Ed Grenby, Editor, British Society of Magazine Editors Awards
 Editor of the Year 2006, 2005: Ed Grenby, Editor, Magazine Design and Journalism Design Awards
 Writer of the Year, 2011: Nick Redman, Deputy Editor, Professional Publishers Association Awards

Content 
The magazine contains regular editorial sections, which include The Knowledge (practical insider advice), Instant Escapes (detailed city and regional guides), The Big Trip (long features), Tips from the Top (celebrity travel), and Hotlist (news and trends), among others.

References

External links 
 

Magazines established in 2003
English-language magazines
Monthly magazines published in the United Kingdom
Tourism magazines